Mathematica Inc. was a multi-faceted American software company and consulting group founded by Princeton University professors in 1968. The computer had three primary divisions: Mathematica Policy Research, which did consulting work, mostly "to develop mathematical models for marketing decision making"; Mathematica Products Group, best known for developing RAMIS; and MathTech, the company's technical and economic consulting group. The company was also a leading developer of state lottery systems.

In early 1982, the company's stock was split 3-for-2. Mathematica Products Group was soon spun off and purchased by Martin Marietta Corporation, in May 1983. The division was then renamed Mathematica & Oxford Software. Marietta sold Mathematica & Oxford Software to On-Line Software International in 1986; On-Line was in turn sold to Computer Associates, in 1991. Mathematica Policy Research and MathTech meanwhile were spun off, and in 1986 both independently became employee-owned companies. Mathematica Policy Research was eventually renamed to Mathematica Inc.; it is the only former unit still carrying the Mathematica name.

Early day participants
 Oskar Morgenstern, economist; one of the company's founders (1969)  
 Tibor Fabian, Mathematica's Hungarian-born president (1980s)
 William Baumol and William Bowen: economists, early day participants

Divisions
 Mathematica Policy Research⁣ – the only former unit still carrying the Mathematica name.
 Mathematica Products Group – best known for developing RAMIS
 MathTech, the company's technical and economic consulting group – "research projects and computer systems other than Ramis."

A quarter of a century after Mathematica's founding, it "was largely owned by a group of  professors in Mathematics and Economics at Princeton University ... as this group aged, they opted to cash out by selling." The result was a 3-way split: two units became employee-owned companies and another was sold several times.

Mathematica Products Group
In 1982, Mathematica Products Group's RAMIS was described as "nonprocedural" and "bordering on artificial intelligence." This unit of Mathematica was purchased by Martin Marietta Corporation in 1983 and renamed to Mathematica & Oxford Software. Marietta sold Mathematica & Oxford Software in 1986 to On-Line Software International, who merged the subsidiary into their own main operations; On-Line was in turn sold to Computer Associates, in 1991.

The RAMIS product sold well, initially on mainframes, subsequently on PCs.

Mathematica Policy Research
The Mathematica Policy Research (MPR) unit's strength was in "social experiments and surveys." In 1983 MPR reported "a major survey assignment for the American Medical Association."

In 1986, it became a separate, employee-owned company.

MathTech
Like MPR, in 1986 MathTech became an employee-owned company. Known today as Mathtech, Inc., it was described by The New York Times as "a Washington-area educational consulting firm

References

Defunct software companies of the United States
Software companies established in 1968
Software companies disestablished in 1986
1983 mergers and acquisitions